Acme is an unincorporated community in Dickinson County, Kansas, United States.

History
A post office was opened in Acme in 1897, and remained in operation until it was discontinued in 1906.

Education
The community is served by Chapman USD 473 public school district.

References

Further reading

External links
 Dickinson County maps: Current, Historic, KDOT

Unincorporated communities in Dickinson County, Kansas
Unincorporated communities in Kansas
1897 establishments in Kansas